YTN is the first 24-hour Korean news channel to be broadcast throughout South Korea. It was founded on September 14, 1993, and began broadcasting on March 1, 1995.

YTN originally stands for Yonhap Television News, as the channel was the subsidiary of Yonhap News Agency until its separation from the agency in 1998. The channel's previous slogans are "Yesterday, Tomorrow and Now" and "Your True Network", both of them being acronyms for the channel's name after the separation. The channel's three current slogans are "Always First", "Exclusive Tomorrow" and "Yes! Top News!". It also has the slogan, "Whenever and wherever there is news, we are there."

History
 

1993/09/14 YTN founded
1995/03/01 Began transmissions
2000/04/08 Merged with Seoul Tower, constructing an integrated broadcast transmission tower
2004/03/01 Moved to YTN tower, next to Namdaemun (South Gate, commonly known as Sungnyemun)
2004/03 Launched "YTN INTERNATIONAL"
2008/01/31 KCC approved YTN FM Radio.
2008/04/01 YTN FM Radio began broadcasting in Seoul city
(Callsign:HLQV-FM Frequency:FM 94.5 MHz.)
2011/04 Renamed from "YTN INTERNATIONAL" to "YTN WORLD"
2014/04 Moved to YTN Newsquare, DMC Area
2017/11/16 YTN FM Radio ceased broadcasts on Los Angeles' 100.3 FM HD 2 in favour of the Educational Media Foundation's (EMF) Christian Rock feed, Air1 after the purchase of KSWD by EMF.

YTN services
 YTN: Korea's first all-news TV channel, carries up-to-the-minute news, weather, sports and traffic, as well as in-depth analysis. The live newscast can be seen 24 hours a day, but live magazines are only in between 4:30 and 1:00.
 YTN Science: The first Korean science channel, provides a wide range of science information.
 YTN2: This channel delivers weather forecasts as well as up-to-date information on disasters and tips for a healthy lifestyle. It broadcasts live 24 hours a day.
 YTN News FM: Korea's only all news radio station with the latest news, weather, traffic, plus some music. It broadcasts live 24 hours a day.
 YTN World: International broadcaster to spread various Korean news and content on culture, IT industry, and business across the world.
 YTN Korean: Korea's advanced overseas Koreans specialized broadcaster, dedicated to multinational exchanges via Internet.

Programming 
YTN programming consists of a mix of live news bulletins, live broadcasts from major breaking news, commentary panel programs and overnight replays.

YTN increased its all news programming offerings in 2017, with three new weekday shows: Midnight News (midnight1am), Morning News (6am8am) and News Talk (11am11:40am).

Throughout most of the day, rolling news coverage is presented from one of two YTN's studios. From 7:30pm to 8:15pm (weekdays) and from 9:15pm to 10pm (weekends), commentary programs are broadcast. Most of these programs are presented by commentators discussing the general issues that Korea and the world are facing. On the evening part, along with updates, YTN also features main news of the day and expects tomorrow's headlines. Overnight, the channel carries a 20-minute news program presented live from the newsroom on the hour (3am and 4am: only 10 minutes long), along with replays of daytime magazines.

See also
YTN Group
N Seoul Tower
Yonhap
Korean Central Television
BBC World News
CNN

References

 YTN at Doosan Encyclopedia

External links
 
YTN corporate information 

YTN Group
24-hour television news channels in South Korea
Television networks in South Korea
Television channels and stations established in 1995
Companies listed on KOSDAQ
Korean-language television stations
Mapo District